WMU may refer to:

 Western Michigan University
 Wildlife Management Unit, the areas into which Pennsylvania's wilderness area are divided into.
 Woman's Missionary Union
 World Maritime University
 Wing Management Utilities for Civil Air Patrol
Hryvnia-equivalent Webmoney